The 1956 Los Angeles Rams season was the team's 19th year with the National Football League and the 11th season in Los Angeles.

Transactions
July 27, 1956: Andy Robustelli was traded from the Los Angeles Rams to the New York Giants in exchange for the Giants First Round selection.

Schedule

Standings

References

Los Angeles Rams
Los Angeles Rams seasons
Los Angeles